Ohio Township is one of the fourteen townships of Clermont County, Ohio, United States. The 2010 census reported 5,192 people living in the township, 2,610 of whom were in the unincorporated portions of the township.

Geography
Located in the southwestern part of the county along the Ohio River, it borders the following townships:
Pierce Township - north
Monroe Township - southeast
Campbell County, Kentucky lies across the Ohio River to the southwest.

The village of New Richmond is located in southwestern Ohio Township, along the Ohio River.

Name and history
Statewide, other Ohio Townships are located in Gallia and Monroe counties.

Government
The township is governed by a three-member board of trustees, who are elected in November of odd-numbered years to a four-year term beginning on the following January 1. Two are elected in the year after the presidential election and one is elected in the year before it. There is also an elected township fiscal officer, who serves a four-year term beginning on April 1 of the year after the election, which is held in November of the year before the presidential election. Vacancies in the fiscal officership or on the board of trustees are filled by the remaining trustees.

References

External links
County website

Townships in Clermont County, Ohio